In statistics, the correlation ratio is a measure of the curvilinear relationship between the statistical dispersion within individual categories and the dispersion across the whole population or sample. The measure is defined as the ratio of two standard deviations representing these types of variation. The context here is the same as that of the intraclass correlation coefficient, whose value is the square of the correlation ratio.

Definition

Suppose each observation is yxi where x indicates the category that observation is in and i is the label of the particular observation.  Let nx be the number of observations in category x and
 
   and   

The correlation ratio η (eta) is defined as to satisfy

which can be written as

i.e. the weighted variance of the category means divided by the variance of all samples.
 
It can therefore be used for judging non-linear relationships.

Range
The correlation ratio  takes values between 0 and 1. The limit  represents the special case of no dispersion among the means of the different categories, while  refers to no dispersion within the respective categories.  is undefined when all data points of the complete population take the same value.

Example
Suppose there is a distribution of test scores in three topics (categories):
Algebra: 45, 70, 29, 15 and 21 (5 scores) 
Geometry: 40, 20, 30 and 42 (4 scores)
Statistics: 65, 95, 80, 70, 85 and 73 (6 scores).
Then the subject averages are 36, 33 and 78, with an overall average of 52. 

The sums of squares of the differences from the subject averages are 1952 for Algebra, 308 for Geometry and 600 for Statistics, adding to 2860. The overall sum of squares of the differences from the overall average is 9640. The difference of 6780 between these is also the weighted sum of the squares of the differences between the subject averages and the overall average:

This gives 

suggesting that most of the overall dispersion is a result of differences between topics, rather than within topics.  Taking the square root gives
    
For  the overall sample dispersion is purely due to dispersion among the categories and not at all due to dispersion within the individual categories. For quick comprehension simply imagine all Algebra, Geometry, and Statistics scores being the same respectively, e.g. 5 times 36, 4 times 33, 6 times 78. 

The limit  refers to the case without dispersion among the categories contributing to the overall dispersion. The trivial requirement for this extreme is that all category means are the same.

Pearson v. Fisher
The correlation ratio was introduced by Karl Pearson as part of analysis of variance. Ronald Fisher commented: 
"As a descriptive statistic the utility of the correlation ratio is extremely limited. It will be noticed that the number of degrees of freedom in the numerator of  depends on the number of the arrays" to which Egon Pearson (Karl's son) responded by saying 
"Again, a long-established method such as the use of the correlation ratio [§45 The "Correlation Ratio" η] is passed over in a few words without adequate description, which is perhaps hardly fair to the student who is given no opportunity of judging its scope for himself."

References

Covariance and correlation
Statistical ratios